In the mathematical area of order theory, one often speaks about functions that preserve  certain limits, i.e. certain suprema or infima. Roughly speaking, these functions map the supremum/infimum of a set to the supremum/infimum of the image of the set. Depending on the type of sets for which a function satisfies this property, it may preserve finite, directed, non-empty, or just arbitrary suprema or infima. Each of these requirements appears naturally and frequently in many areas of order theory and there are various important relationships among these concepts and other notions such as monotonicity. If the implication of limit preservation is inverted, such that the existence of limits in the range of a function implies the existence of limits in the domain, then one obtains functions that are limit-reflecting.

The purpose of this article is to clarify the definition of these basic concepts, which is necessary since the literature is not always consistent at this point, and to give general results and explanations on these issues.

Background and motivation 

In many specialized areas of order theory, one restricts to classes of partially ordered sets that are complete with respect to certain limit constructions. For example, in lattice theory, one is interested in orders where all finite non-empty sets have both a least upper bound and a greatest lower bound. In domain theory, on the other hand, one focuses on partially ordered sets in which every directed subset has a supremum. Complete lattices and orders with a least element (the "empty supremum") provide further examples.

In all these cases, limits play a central role for the theories, supported by their interpretations in practical applications of each discipline. One also is interested in specifying appropriate mappings between such orders. From an algebraic viewpoint, this means that one wants to find adequate notions of homomorphisms for the structures under consideration. This is achieved by considering those functions that are compatible with the constructions that are characteristic for the respective orders. For example, lattice homomorphisms are those functions that preserve non-empty finite suprema and infima, i.e. the image of a supremum/infimum of two elements is just the supremum/infimum of their images. In domain theory, one often deals with so-called Scott-continuous functions that preserve all directed suprema.

The background for the definitions and terminology given below is to be found in category theory, where  limits (and co-limits) in a more general sense are considered. The categorical concept of limit-preserving and limit-reflecting functors is in complete harmony with order theory, since orders can be considered as small categories defined as poset categories with defined additional structure.

Formal definition 

Consider two partially ordered sets P and Q, and a function f from P to Q. Furthermore, let S be a subset of P that has a least upper bound s. Then f preserves the supremum of S if the set f(S) = {f(x) | x in S} has a least upper bound in Q which is equal to f(s), i.e.
 f(sup S) = sup f(S)

Note that this definition consists of two requirements: the supremum of the set f(S) exists and it is equal to f(s). This corresponds to the abovementioned parallel to category theory, but is not always required in the literature. In fact, in some cases one weakens the definition to require only existing suprema to be equal to f(s). However, Wikipedia works with the common notion given above and states the other condition explicitly if required.

From the fundamental definition given above, one can derive a broad range of useful properties. A function f between posets P and Q is said to preserve finite, non-empty, directed, or arbitrary suprema if it preserves the suprema of all finite, non-empty, directed, or arbitrary sets, respectively. The preservation of non-empty finite suprema can also be defined by the identity f(x v y) = f(x) v f(y), holding for all elements x and y, where we assume v to be a total function on both orders.

In a dual way, one defines properties for the preservation of infima.

The "opposite" condition to preservation of limits is called reflection. Consider a function f as above and a subset S of P, such that sup f(S) exists in Q and is equal to f(s) for some element s of P. Then f reflects the supremum of S if sup S exists and is equal to s. As already demonstrated for preservation, one obtains many additional properties by considering certain classes of sets S and by dualizing the definition to infima.

Special cases 

Some special cases or properties derived from the above scheme are known under other names or are of particular importance to some areas of order theory. For example, functions that preserve the empty supremum are those that preserve the least element. Furthermore, due to the motivation explained earlier, many limit-preserving functions appear as special homomorphisms for certain order structures. Some other prominent cases are given below.

Preservation of all limits 

An interesting situation occurs if a function preserves all suprema (or infima). More accurately, this is expressed by saying that a function preserves all existing suprema (or infima), and it may well be that the posets under consideration are not complete lattices. For example, (monotone) Galois connections have this property. Conversely, by the order theoretical Adjoint Functor Theorem, mappings that preserve all suprema/infima can be guaranteed to be part of a unique Galois connection as long as some additional requirements are met.

Distributivity 

A lattice L is distributive if, for all x, y, and z in L, we find

 

But this just says that the meet function ^: L -> L preserves binary suprema. It is known in lattice theory, that this condition is equivalent to its dual, i.e. the function v: L -> L preserving binary infima. In a similar way, one sees that the infinite distributivity law

 

of complete Heyting algebras (see also pointless topology) is equivalent to the meet function ^ preserving arbitrary suprema. This condition, however, does not imply its dual.

Scott-continuity 

Functions that preserve directed suprema are called Scott-continuous or sometimes just continuous, if this does not cause confusions with the according concept of analysis and topology. A similar use of the term continuous for preservation of limits can also be found in category theory.

Important properties and results 

The above definition of limit preservation is quite strong. Indeed, every function that preserves at least the suprema or infima of two-element chains, i.e. of sets of two comparable elements, is necessarily monotone. Hence, all the special preservation properties stated above induce monotonicity.

Based on the fact that some limits can be expressed in terms of others, one can derive connections between the preservation properties.
For example, a function f preserves directed suprema if and only if it preserves the suprema of all ideals.
Furthermore, a mapping f from a poset in which every non-empty finite supremum exists (a so-called sup-semilattice) preserves arbitrary suprema if and only if it preserves both directed and finite (possibly empty) suprema.

However, it is not true that a function that preserves all suprema would also preserve all infima or vice versa.

Order theory